Tobruk International Airport  is an airport serving the Mediterranean port city of Tobruk, capital of the Butnan District of Libya.

History
The airport was previously named Gamal Abdel Nasser Airport, after the president of the former United Arab Republic.

The airport was officially opened as Tobruk International Airport on 29 April 2013. The oldest airport in Libya, it had previously offered only internal flights. The first international passenger flight was to Alexandria, Egypt, operated by Libyan Airlines. The airport operates domestic flights to Benghazi and Tripoli.

A new passenger terminal is currently under construction. The airport will have a duty-free zone. Plans are currently underway to establish cargo service to Tobruk's International Airport.

Historical background
At the beginning of World War II, Libya was an Italian colony and Tobruk became the site of important battles between the Allies and Axis powers. Tobruk was strategically important to the conquest of Eastern Libya, then called the province of Cyrenaica. The airfield was significant due to the importance of air power in desert warfare.

Airlines and destinations

See also
Gamal Abdul El Nasser Airbase
Transport in Libya
List of airports in Libya

References

External links
Tobruk: Australian toughness beats Rommel
Tobruk War cemetery - video 

Tobruk
Cyrenaica
Populated places in Butnan District
Port cities and towns in Libya
Airports in Libya